Angela Gradwell Tuckett (1906-1994) was the first female solicitor in Bristol. She was also a Women's Rights playwright, active Communist, athlete and aviator.

Biography
Angela Tuckett was born in 1906 into a family of Bristol solicitors. Both Angela and her older sister Joan Tuckett became solicitors as well. Their aunt, Enid Stacy, was an English socialist activist.

Tuckett was an active Communist. She was a municipal and county council candidate for the Swindon Communist Party, one of the "Women in Black". In 1962 Angela Tuckett married Ike Gradwell, secretary of the Swindon Communist Party. She was also an international hockey player and trained as pilot. In 1935 she refused to salute Hitler at a game in Berlin and the All England Women's Hockey Association did not reselect her for the team. She was a delegate to the London Trades Council, on the Executive Committee of the Labour Monthly, on the editorial committee of the William Morris Society. She was also active in the International Concertina Association, the English Folk-Dance and Song Society.

In 1940 she directed the legal department of the National Council for Civil Liberties and in 1942 she joined the staff of the Daily Worker. From 1948 to 1978 she worked on the Labour Monthly , for a time assistant editor under R. P. Dutt.

Other than being the first female solicitor in Bristol, Tuckett, together with her sister, wrote plays on women's rights like: The Bulls see Red, Passing unnoticed, Smash and Grab, Aiden & Abetten, and Charity begins. In the 1930s she was active with the League of Progressive Writers.

Legacy
The papers of Bristol Unity Players' Club covering minutes for 1937-46, correspondence, 1938-47, scripts, programmes, and photographs were deposited in the University of Warwick's Modern Records Centre in 1980 by Angela Tuckett.

Her own papers can be found at the Working Class Movement Library which published her biography of Enid Stacy, Our Enid in 2016

References

1906 births
1994 deaths
Lawyers from Bristol
English solicitors
20th-century English lawyers
Women lawyers
English communists